Lucy Griffiths (24 April 1919 – 29 September 1982) was an English actress whose work spanned from the early 1950s to the early 1980s.

Born in Birley, Herefordshire, she had a prolific career in both film and television. She is most famous for her roles in numerous Hammer horror films such as Frankenstein and the Monster from Hell (alongside Peter Cushing), The Two Faces of Dr. Jekyll (Christopher Lee) and television programmes such as On the Buses, Mind Your Language, All Creatures Great and Small, Secret Army and Z-Cars. She also had a small, uncredited bit-part in the classic British film Genevieve, as well as several other small uncredited roles in numerous British productions.

Selected filmography

 Will Any Gentleman...? (1953) - Blonde Outside Bank
 Personal Affair (1953) - 2nd Gossip (uncredited)
 Devil on Horseback (1954) - Maid
 One Good Turn (1955) - Nancy (uncredited)
 Children Galore (1955) - Miss Prescott
 The Ladykillers (1955) - Miss Pringle (uncredited)
 Doublecross (1956) - Barmaid
 The Green Man (1956) - Annabel
 A Touch of the Sun (1956) - Aggie 
 Gideon's Day (1958) - Cashier (uncredited)
 The Spaniard's Curse (1958) - Minor Role (uncredited)
 Carry On Nurse (1959) - Trolley Lady
 Jack the Ripper (1959) - Salvation Army Woman
 The Ugly Duckling (1959) - Cellist (uncredited)
 Please Turn Over (1959) - 1st Gossip in bookshop queue
 The Flesh and the Fiends (1960) - Crone (uncredited)
 Carry On Constable (1960) - Miss Horton - (voice dubbed by Marianne Stone)
 The Two Faces of Dr. Jekyll (1960) - Tavern Woman (uncredited)
 Carry On Regardless (1961) - Auntie (uncredited)
 The Third Alibi (1961) - Miss Potter
 Murder, She Said (1961) - Lucy
 She Knows Y'Know (1962) - Jenny Higginbottom
 Return to Sender (1963) - Agatha
 Nurse on Wheels (1963) - Lady at Window (uncredited)
 The Mouse on the Moon (1963) - Lady-in-Waiting (uncredited)
 Murder Most Foul (1964) - Miss Rusty (uncredited)
 Murder Ahoy! (1964) - Millie
 Stranger in the House (1967) - Library cleaner (uncredited)
 Carry On Doctor (1967) - Miss Morris - Elderly Patient
 The Magnificent Six and 1/2: When Knights Were Bold (1968) - Frightened Woman
 Carry On Again Doctor (1969) - Old Lady in Headphones
 Carry On Loving (1970) - Woman (scenes deleted)
 Under Milk Wood (1972)
 Follow Me! (1972) - Bertha (uncredited)
 No Sex Please, We're British (1973) - Spinster Lady
 Frankenstein and the Monster from Hell (1974) - Old Hag
 One of Our Dinosaurs Is Missing (1975) - Amelia
 Carry On Behind (1975) - Lady with Hat (uncredited)
 The Hound of the Baskervilles (1978) - Iris

References

External links

English television actresses
English film actresses
1919 births
1982 deaths
Actresses from Hertfordshire
20th-century English actresses